Odyneromyia is a genus of hoverflies in the family Syrphidae.

Species
 Subgenus Austroxylota 
Odyneromyia illucens (Ferguson, 1926)
Odyneromyia iridescens (Ferguson, 1926)
Odyneromyia spadix (Hardy, 1921)
Odyneromyia transparens (Paramonov, 1955)
 Subgenus Odyneromyia Shannon & Aubertin, 1933
Odyneromyia odyneroides (Philippi, 1865)
Odyneromyia valdiviformis Shannon & Aubertin, 1933

References

Eristalinae
Diptera of Australasia
Hoverfly genera
Taxa named by Raymond Corbett Shannon